The Yazoo shiner (Notropis rafinesquei) is a species of freshwater ray-finned fish in the genus Notropis.

It is endemic to Mississippi in the Southeastern United States, where it inhabits the upper tributaries of the Yazoo River system.

References 

 

Yazoo shiner
Yazoo shiner
Fish of the Eastern United States
Freshwater fish of the United States
Yazoo shiner